The 125th Street station is a station on the IRT Lenox Avenue Line of the New York City Subway. Located at the intersection of 125th Street (also known as Dr. Martin Luther King Jr Boulevard) and Lenox Avenue (also known as Malcolm X Boulevard) in Harlem, it is served by the 2 and 3 trains at all times.

The 125th Street station was constructed for the Interborough Rapid Transit Company (IRT) as part of the city's first subway line, which was approved in 1900. Construction on the tunnel segment that includes the 125th Street station started on October 2 of the same year. The station opened on November 23, 1904. The station platforms were lengthened in 1910.

The 125th Street station contains two side platforms and two tracks. The station was built with tile and mosaic decorations. The platforms contain exits to Lenox Avenue's intersection with 125th Street and are not connected to each other within fare control.

History

Construction and opening 
Planning for a subway line in New York City dates to 1864. However, development of what would become the city's first subway line did not start until 1894, when the New York State Legislature authorized the Rapid Transit Act. The subway plans were drawn up by a team of engineers led by William Barclay Parsons, chief engineer of the Rapid Transit Commission. It called for a subway line from New York City Hall in lower Manhattan to the Upper West Side, where two branches would lead north into the Bronx. A plan was formally adopted in 1897, and legal challenges were resolved near the end of 1899. The Rapid Transit Construction Company, organized by John B. McDonald and funded by August Belmont Jr., signed the initial Contract 1 with the Rapid Transit Commission in February 1900, in which it would construct the subway and maintain a 50-year operating lease from the opening of the line. In 1901, the firm of Heins & LaFarge was hired to design the underground stations. Belmont incorporated the Interborough Rapid Transit Company (IRT) in April 1902 to operate the subway.

The 125th Street station was constructed as part of the IRT's East Side Branch (now the Lenox Avenue Line). Farrell & Hopper began building the section from 110th Street to 135th Street on August 30, 1900, subcontracting the section north of 116th Street to John C. Rodgers. The excavation was relatively easy because the subway was under one side of Lenox Avenue and there were no street railway tracks to work around.

On November 23, 1904, the East Side Branch opened to 145th Street. Initially, the station was served by East Side local and express trains. Local trains ran from City Hall to Lenox Avenue (145th Street). Express trains had their southern terminus at South Ferry or Atlantic Avenue and had their northern terminus at 145th Street or West Farms (180th Street). Express trains to 145th Street were eliminated in 1906, and West Farms express trains operated through to Atlantic Avenue in Brooklyn.

Service changes and station renovations
To address overcrowding, in 1909, the New York Public Service Commission proposed lengthening platforms at stations along the original IRT subway. As part of a modification to the IRT's construction contracts, made on January 18, 1910, the company was to lengthen station platforms to accommodate ten-car express and six-car local trains. In addition to $1.5 million (equivalent to $ million in ) spent on platform lengthening, $500,000 was spent on building additional entrances and exits. It was anticipated that these improvements would increase capacity by 25 percent. The platforms at the 125th Street station were extended  to both the north and south. On January 23, 1911, ten-car express trains began running on the East Side Branch.

In 1918, the Broadway–Seventh Avenue Line opened south of Times Square–42nd Street, thereby dividing the original line into an "H"-shaped system. Local trains were sent to South Ferry, while express trains used the new Clark Street Tunnel to Brooklyn.

The city government took over the IRT's operations on June 12, 1940. The IRT routes were given numbered designations with the introduction of "R-type" rolling stock. These fleet contained rollsigns with numbered designations for each service. The first such fleet, the R12, was put into service in 1948. The route to White Plains Road, formerly the route to West Farms, became known as the 2, while the route to Lenox Avenue–145th Street became the 3. In 1959, all 2 and 3 trains became express. In November 1959, the Warshaw Construction Company received a contract to remove fifteen entrance/exit kiosks on IRT lines, including four at the 125th Street station. This was part of a citywide initiative to remove the kiosks, which obstructed motorists' views of pedestrians.

On May 23, 1968, poet Henry Dumas was fatally shot by a New York City Transit Police officer on the station's southbound platform.

In 1981, the MTA listed the station among the 69 most deteriorated stations in the subway system. Starting on March 2, 1998, the tunnel was reconstructed along with the cracked tunnel floor. This was done to correct a major water problem that had existed for many years due to the presence of the Harlem Creek and other underground streams, which caused extensive flooding, water damage, and seepage problems that occasionally contributed to severe service disruptions. The project cost $82 million and was finished on October 12, 1998. During the reconstruction, many  trains were rerouted via the IRT Lexington Avenue Line, while the  trains were rerouted to the 137th Street–City College station on the IRT Broadway–Seventh Avenue Line. Each of the two Lenox Avenue Line tracks were alternately taken out of service and supplemental shuttle bus service connecting to other lines in the area were provided for much of this time.

Station layout

The station has two tracks and two side platforms. The 2 and 3 trains stop here at all times. The platform extensions are at the north ends of the original platforms. Fare control is at platform level. There are no crossovers or crossunders between the two side platforms to allow free transfer between directions.

Design

As with other stations built as part of the original IRT, the station was constructed using a cut-and-cover method. The tunnel is covered by a "U"-shaped trough that contains utility pipes and wires. The platforms consist of  concrete slabs, beneath which are drainage basins. The original platforms contain circular, cast-iron Doric-style columns spaced every , while the platform extensions contain I-beam columns. Additional columns between the tracks, spaced every , support the jack-arched concrete station roofs. There is a  gap between the trough wall and the platform walls, which are made of -thick brick covered over by a tiled finish.

The original decorative scheme consists of blue tile station-name tablets, pink tile bands, a green terracotta cornice, and dark blue terracotta plaques. The mosaic tiles at all original IRT stations were manufactured by the American Encaustic Tile Company, which subcontracted the installations at each station. The decorative work was performed by tile contractor Manhattan Glass Tile Company and terracotta contractor Atlantic Terra Cotta Company. Many of the original name tablets have since been replaced with newer renditions, but most of the plaques remain intact.

The artwork in the station is Flying Home: Harlem Heroes and Heroines, by Faith Ringgold, installed in 1996.

Exits
Two staircases from each platform lead to the intersection of Lenox Avenue and West 125th Street. The staircases from the southbound platform lead to the western corners, while those from the northbound platform lead to the eastern corners.

References

External links 

 
 nycsubway.org — Flying Home Harlem Heroes and Heroines Artwork by Faith Ringgold (1996)
 Station Reporter — 2 Train
 Station Reporter — 3 Train
 The Subway Nut — 125th Street Pictures 
 MTA's Arts For Transit — 125th Street (IRT Lenox Avenue Line)
 125th Street entrance from Google Maps Street View
 Platforms from Google Maps Street View

1904 establishments in New York City
Harlem
IRT Lenox Avenue Line stations
New York City Subway stations in Manhattan
Railway stations in the United States opened in 1904